The 2016 RAN Sevens will be the 16th edition of the annual rugby sevens tournament organized by Rugby Americas North. It will be played in Trinidad and Tobago at Saint Mary's College in Port of Spain

The top two teams (excluding Canada) will qualify for the 2017 Hong Kong Sevens for a chance to qualify as a core team in the Sevens World Series.

First round

All times are Atlantic Standard Time (UTC-4)

Pool A

Pool B

Pool C

Pool D

Consolation Round

Pool 1

Pool 2

Finals

Consolation Match

Shield Final

Bowl Final

Knockout round

Plate

Cup

Final standings

References

2016
2016 rugby sevens competitions
2016 in North American rugby union
rugby union
rugby union
2016 in Trinidad and Tobago sport